Maximo Sebastian Ortiz (born 16 February 1988) is a Paraguayan football defender. Ortiz represented the Paraguay national under-17 team at the 2005 South American U-17 Championship in Venezuela.

Club career
In the 2009 season, Ortiz played for Fernando de la Mora, appearing in the División Intermedia.

In the 2011 season, Ortiz played for Sportivo Trinidense.

In the 2012 season, Ortiz appeared again for Fernando de la Mora.

In the 2013 season, Ortiz again played for Sportivo Trinidense. In the 2013 División Intermedia season, Ortiz played in a 1–0 away victory against Tacuary.

During the 2014 División Intermedia season, Ortiz played in a 1–0 home victory against Caacupe FBC.

In the 2016 División Intermedia season, Ortiz played for Ciudad del Este team 3 de Febrero.

In the 2017 Sportivo Trinidense team, he joined Elvis Marecos, Arturo Aquino, Fabio Ramos, Ignacio Miño, Fabio Escobar, Julio Santa Cruz, Rodrigo Teixeira, Sergio Escalante and Jang Hee-mang.

On 7 August 2018 in the Copa Paraguay, Ortiz scored for Tacuary in a penalty shoot-out defeat against Guaraní.

International career
Ortiz played for Paraguay at the 2005 South American U-17 Championship. He scored in the 34th minute of a 3–1 victory against the host team Venezuela.

References

External links
 
 Maximo Ortiz at Playmaker

1988 births
Living people
Paraguayan footballers
Paraguay youth international footballers
Association football defenders
Sportivo Trinidense footballers